LPS/Kuninkaat is a football club from Helsinki in Finland.  The club was formed in 1999.  Team currently plays in the Nelonen (fourth division).  LPS/Kuninkaat is playing under the flag of Laajasalon Palloseura.

Background
The club was established by a group of friends in 1999. Same friends played Floorball in a club called S.C. Kings before the football club. Kuninkaat couldn't use the name S.C. Kings in football because a club named S.C. Kings already existed.  LPS/Kuninkaat started their journey in Finnish seventh division and picked up one level every year until 4th division. Kuninkaat has also a team in futsal.

Club Structure
LPS/Kuninkaat is part of Laajasalon Palloseura.

2015 season
LPS / Kuninkaat is participating in Section 2 of the Nelonen (Fourth Division) administered by the Helsinki SPL.

2016 season
LPS / Kuninkaat is participating in Section 2 of the Nelonen (Fourth Division) administered by the Helsinki SPL.

References and sources
Official Website
Finnish Wikipedia
 Facebook

Footnotes

Football clubs in Helsinki